The Wisest Ones is the third full-length album released by the alternative rock band Zebra & Giraffe.

Reception 

The Wisest Ones has mainly received positive reviews. The Times praised it as the album where the band defined its unique mixture of instruments, saying, "The Wisest Ones seems to have given Zebra & Giraffe a more consistent sound and now, with their three-piece set up of guitar icon Alan Shenton and madman Mike Wright, the band is ready to come into their own." Perdeby praises the depth of emotion, saying, "This is Carlin as you’ve never seen him before"

Track listing

References

2012 albums
Zebra & Giraffe albums